Maddipadu mandal is one of the 56 mandals in Prakasam district of the state of Andhra Pradesh, India. Its headquarters are located at Maddipadu. The mandal is bounded by Naguluppalapadu, Ongole, Santhanuthlapadu, and Chimakurthi mandals. The mandals lies on the shore of Bay of Bengal.

Demographics 

 census, the mandal had a population of 52,353. The total population constitute, 26,155 males and 26,198 females —a sex ratio of 1002 females per 1000 males. 5,220 children are in the age group of 0–6 years, of which 2,731 are boys and 2,489 are girls —a ratio of 911 per 1000. The average literacy rate stands at 64.51% with 30,406 literates. in maddipadu oldest temple is Sri Ramalayam constructed nearly 100 years back. In the last 10 years temple is developed lot by Ramalaya Committee. Three festivels conducted in temple every year goda devi vratham and godadevi kalyanam on bhogi and sriramanavami, vaikuntaekadasi are famous festivals in temple

Towns and villages 

The mandal has 23 villages, that includes:

See also 
Prakasam district

References

Mandals in Prakasam district